The Brothers Grimm were German collectors and publishers of folk tales.

Brothers Grimm may also refer to:

 The Brothers Grimm (film), a 2005 fantasy by Terry Gilliam
 Brothers Grimm (comics), Marvel Comics supervillains
 Brothers Grimm (album), by Drapht
 Brothers Grim (band), a Russian pop-rock group
 Brothers Grym, an American hip-hop group
 "Brothers Grimm", an All Grown Up! episode
 The Wonderful World of the Brothers Grimm, a 1962 film by Henry Levin and George Pal

See also
 Grimm (disambiguation)
 Grimsby (film), released in the United States as The Brothers Grimsby